Potassium thioacetate is an organosulfur compound and a salt with the formula .  This white, water-soluble solid is used as a reagent for preparing thioacetate esters and other derivatives.

Synthesis and reactions
Potassium thioacetate, which is commercially available, can be prepared by combining acetyl chloride and potassium hydrogen sulfide:
CH3COCl + 2 KSH -> KCl + CH3COSK + H2S
It arises also by the neutralization of thioacetic acid with potassium hydroxide.

Use in preparation of thiols
In a common application, potassium thioacetate is combined with alkylating agents to give thioacetate esters (X = halide):
CH3COSK + RX -> CH3COSR + KX
Hydrolysis of these esters affords thiols:
CH3COSR + H2O -> CH3CO2H + RSH

The thioacetate esters can also be cleaved with methanethiol in the presence of stoichiometric base, as illustrated in the preparation of pent-4-yne-1-thiol:
H3C(CH2)3OMs + KSAc -> H3C(CH2)3SAc  + KOMs
H3C(CH2)3SAc + HSMe -> H3C(CH2)3SH  + MeSAc

References

Reagents for organic chemistry
Organosulfur compounds
Potassium compounds